The church of the Holy Spirit (Italian: Chiesa dello Spirito Santo) is a Norman church in Palermo, Sicily, southern Italy. The church is located within the boundaries of Sant'Orsola cemetery.

History
The Cistercian monastery was founded between 1173 and 1178 by the archbishop of Palermo, Walter of the Mill, and was entrusted to monks of the calabrese Abbey of Sambucina. Considerable donations of King William II of Sicily and his mother,  Margaret, enriched the monastery's property.

On March 30, 1282, it was in front of this church that the popular insurrection, later named the Sicilian Vespers, exploded.

Notes

External links

Christian monasteries established in the 12th century
Roman Catholic churches in Palermo
Arab-Norman architecture in Palermo
Churches with Norman architecture